Teresa Isaac, an American politician, served as mayor of Lexington, Kentucky from 2003 to 2007.

Political life
Isaac was elected to the Lexington-Fayette Urban County Government council as an At-Large member in 1988.  In 1992, she was reelected to the Urban County Council (UCC) becoming the Vice-Mayor.  She served in that capacity until 1999.  In 1996, Teresa Isaac ran for the Democratic nomination for Kentucky's 6th congressional district.  She came in third.

Isaac returned to elected office in 2002 as the Mayor of Lexington, Kentucky.  

In that race, she defeated attorney Scott Crosbie.  Crosbie had previously served on the City Council. Isaac's victory was credited to her tireless campaigning and a light turnout in the suburbs, which represented Crosbie's political base of conservatives.

Her term as mayor was marked with controversy, as her controversial attempts to use eminent domain to condemn the local water company and the Lexington Mall both failed due to public resistance.  The Mayor cites the following accomplishments:

 Eminent domain proceedings to gain local ownership of Lexington's water utility from a foreign-owned conglomerate
 Increased pay for police, firefighters and corrections personnel
 Budget cuts to every other area of government, including significant cuts to her own office budget

However, on November 7, 2006, Vote NO won and condemnation of the water company ended.

In 2006, Isaac ran for reelection but lost to political newcomer and Lexington corporate attorney Jim Newberry.  Most recently, Isaac has been employed as a campaign staffer for Kentucky businessman Bruce Lunsford.  Lunsford made an unsuccessful attempt to win the Democratic nomination for Kentucky Governor in May 2007.  Isaac currently practices law and teaches as an adjunct professor at several Kentucky colleges. She has been a crusader for same sex marriage and LGBTQ rights. She currently is championing the cause of the Green movement and seeks to curtail or end all coal fire burning
plants and factories in the United States including Kentucky's own coal industry which says claims is destroying the natural
beauty of Kentucky. She said her downfall was the ill-fated forced attempt of the government takeover of the Lexington
water company, which ruined her chances at a second term as Mayor of Lexington.

References

Kentucky Democrats
Mayors of Lexington, Kentucky
Women mayors of places in Kentucky
Transylvania University alumni
Living people
Year of birth missing (living people)
21st-century American women